The British Collegiate American Football League (BCAFL) was an American football league consisting of players from various colleges and universities in the United Kingdom.

In 2007 it was succeeded by the British Universities American Football League.

The league officially began in the 1985–1986 season with 4 teams, with founder members Newcastle Skolars, led by Mike Rea, and Hull University, and celebrated its 20th anniversary with 37 teams competing the 2005–2006 campaign. The final season was contested by 39 teams, with some teams consisting of players from more than one institution.

Throughout its existence, BCAFL was plagued by the fact that some of its teams played at a vastly higher skill level than others. During its final years the British Student American Football Association (BSAFA), who was responsible for the operations of BCAFL, made great strides towards competitive balance; increasing the skill level on the field and expanding the game throughout the UK. However, after extended public disagreements with the policies of the governing body of the British American Football Association (BAFA), the BAFA dissolved the BSAFA with all the teams being forced to transfer to the new British university American Football League (BUAFL).

Rules
BCAFL largely followed the rules of American college football (though there were restrictions on the number of North American players allowed on the field at any one time). As opposed to the conference and "bowl game" set-up used in American college football BCAFL divided itself into two conferences and used a season-ending playoff system, similar to the NFL (however, below the Bowl Subdivision of Division I, the NCAA uses a season-ending playoff system to crown national champions). At the end of an 8-game regular season, 16 teams would advance to the playoffs (the playoffs expanded from 12 to 16 teams in the 2004–2005 season), with the 4 division champions and 4 "wild card" teams from each conference participating. The playoffs culminated with a championship game, called the "College Bowl" which features the champions of the Northern and Southern Conferences.

Teams

Full Member records
Teams are listed within their divisions, with their all-time regular season record listed (records include ONLY official BCAFL regular season games through the 2006–07 season, as recorded in the BCAFL official all-time records).

Associate members
 Bristol Barracuda 2007/8
 Durham Saints 2007/8

Defunct Teams
 Aberdeen Steamroller (0–8–0, .000)
 Aston Rhinos (10–43–3, .205)
 Cambridge Pythons (38–16–2, .696)
 Dundee Bluedevils (1–7–0, .125)
 Manchester MPs (3–12–2, .235)
 Strathclyde Hawks (64–41–15, .596)

BCAFL/College Bowl History
 1986 – Hull Sharks (5–0)
 1987 – College Bowl I: Hull Sharks def. Newcastle Scholars 23–6
 1988 – CB II: Cardiff Cobras tie Hull Sharks 0–0 (declared Co-Champions)
 1989 – CB III: Hull Sharks def. Cardiff Cobras 7–6
 1990 – CB IV: Teesside Demons def. Birmingham Lions 21–20
 1991 – CB V: Teesside Demons def. UEA Pirates 19–0
 1992 – CB VI: Southampton Stags def. Glasgow Tigers 53–0
 1993 – CB VII: Southampton Stags def. Leeds Celtics 19–0
 1994 – CB VIII: Glasgow Tigers def. Leicester Lemmings 26–0
 1995 – CB IX: Loughborough Aces def. Cambridge Pythons 23–20
 1996 – CB X: Leeds Celtics def. Cardiff Cobras 14–8
 1997 – CB XI: Loughborough Aces def. Tarannau Aberystwyth 28–19
 1998 – CB XII: Hertfordshire Hurricanes def. Leeds Celtics 16–7
 1999 – CB XIII: Hertfordshire Hurricanes def. Loughborough Aces 7–3
 2000 – CB XIV: Hertfordshire Hurricanes def. Leicester Lemmings 20–6
 2001 – CB XV: Oxford Cavaliers def. Loughborough Aces 26–23
 2002 – CB XVI: Loughborough Aces def. Oxford Cavaliers 39–23
 2003 – CB XVII: Stirling Clansmen def. Hertfordshire Hurricanes 22–17
 2004 – CB XVIII: Hertfordshire Hurricanes def. Staffordshire Stallions 27–6
 2005 – CB XIX: Birmingham Lions def. Glasgow Tigers 34–7
 2006 – CB XX: Southampton Stags def. UT Cougars 79–8
 2007 – CB XXI: Bristol Bullets def. Loughborough Aces 31–14

2006–07 season

Regular season

y – Clinched Division Title
x – Clinched Playoff Berth

Playoffs

All-star game
Each season BCAFL held an All-Star game between the Northern Conference Cougars and the Southern Conference Wildcats. Trials for these All-Star teams are open to all players in the league. Along with the accolades of competing for their conference, All-Star players are also eligible to try out for the Great Britain Bulldogs, a national college team that competes with North American and other European American football national teams.

 
American football leagues in the United Kingdom
Defunct American football leagues in Europe
1985 establishments in the United Kingdom
Sports leagues established in 1985
2007 disestablishments in the United Kingdom
Sports leagues disestablished in 2007